Phthiria vagans  is a species of 'bee flies' belonging to the family Bombyliidae.

Distribution

This palearctic species is present in part of Europe (Croatia, France, Greece, Hungary, Italy, North Macedonia, Romania and Spain), in Central and North European Russia, in Iran and in Israel, and in Turkey.

Description 
These tiny beeflies are mainly blackish, with white stripes on the abdomen. Metapleuron shows micro-pubescence. The upper part of the face and the area around the antennae are black-haired. They show a short dorsal prong at the tips of the antennae. Palpus extends at least as far as antennae. Last sternite in male deeply concave on posterior margin.

The red eyes are touching in males of all Phthiriinae, while they are separate in females (sexual dimorphism). The base of the wings is yellowish, the central part is brown, while the tip is transparent.

Biology
These beeflies are active during the middle of the day (heliophilic).

References

External links
 Ukrainian Biodiversity Information Network
 Barry Fotopage
 Insectarium Virtual

Bombyliidae
Insects described in 1846
Asilomorph flies of Europe